Belazaima do Chão was a freguesia ("civil parish") in Águeda Municipality, Aveiro District, Portugal. It had an area of 19.8 km2 and in 2011 had a population of 599.

History 
In 2013 it was merged with Castanheira do Vouga and with Agadão to form the new freguesia of Belazaima do Chão, Castanheira do Vouga e Agadão.

Places 
 Alvarim
 Belazaima do Chão
 Belazaima-a-Velha
 Cepos
 Corça
 Feridouro
 Póvoa de S. Domingos
 Póvoa de Vale do Trigo

Demography

Politics

Elections 
In the 2009 local elections for the Assembly of the Freguesia, there were 579 registered voters, with 454 (78.41%) voting and 125 (21.59%) abstaining. The Social Democratic Party got 365 votes (80.40%), electing six members of the Assembly and the Democratic and Social Centre – People's Party got 70 votes (15.42%), electing one member of the Assembly. As of 31 December 2011, the freguesia had 572 registered voters.

Religion 
The Portuguese Roman Catholic Church's Diocese of Aveiro includes the Parish of Belazaima do Chão as part of the archpriestship of Águeda. The Igreja Matriz de Belazaima do Chão was finished in 1748 and is classified as a Monument of Public Interest.

References 

Former parishes of Águeda
2013 disestablishments in Portugal
Populated places disestablished in 2013